Nationality words link to articles with information on the nation's poetry or literature (for instance, Irish or France).

Events

Works published
 Sir Richard Blackmore, published anonymously, The Nature of Man
 John Dryden, translator, Metamorphoses, translated from the Latin original of Ovid
 William King, An Historical Account of the Heathen Gods and Heroes
 Alexander Pope, An Essay on Criticism
 Jonathan Swift, editor, Miscellanies in Prose and Verse, anthology, including 25 works by Swift
 Edward Ward, The Life and Notable Adventures of that Renown'd Knight Don Quixote de la Mancha (originally published in six monthly parts, 1710–1711)
 James Watson (Scottish editor), editor, Choice Collection of Comic and Serious Scots Poems, Edinburgh (published from 1706 to 1711)

Births
Death years link to the corresponding "[year] in poetry" article:
 January 15 – Sidonia Hedwig Zäunemann (died 1740), German
 March 22 – Samuel Gotthold Lange (died 1781), German
 April 10 – John Gambold (died 1771), Welsh-born religious poet and bishop of the Moravian Church.
 May – Henry Taylor (died 1785), Church of England clergyman, religious writer and poet
 May 18 – Ruđer Bošković (died 1787), Ragusan polymath and poet
 October 17 – Jupiter Hammon (died sometime before 1806), English Colonial African American

Deaths
Birth years link to the corresponding "[year] in poetry" article:
 March 13 – Nicolas Boileau-Despréaux (born 1636), French poet and critic
 September 4 – John Caryll (born 1625), exiled English poet, dramatist, and diplomat
 Cille Gad (born 1675), Norwegian female poet and scholar, of plague

See also

Poetry
List of years in poetry
List of years in literature
 18th century in poetry
 18th century in literature
 Augustan poetry

Notes

 "A Timeline of English Poetry" Web page of the Representative Poetry Online Web site, University of Toronto

18th-century poetry
Poetry